The discography of American hip hop collective Mo Thugs consists of four studio albums and six singles.

Studio albums

Singles

See also
Layzie Bone discography
Krayzie Bone discography
Bone Thugs-n-Harmony discography

References

Hip hop discographies
Discographies of American artists